Erodium acaule is a species of plant in the family Geraniaceae.

Description
Perennial, acaulescent, 15–25 cm high. Hairs spare, appressed. Root vertical, lignified. Leaves rosulate, lanceolate-oblong, spreading on soil, pinnatisect. Segments sessile, oblong-ovate, Pinnatilobed, in short and acute strips. Flowers 1.5 cm in diameter, bright pink. Petals equal,  2-3 times longer than calyx, rounded at apex. Beak of fruits 4–5 cm long.

Flowering
Nearly all the year round.

Habitat
Fields. waste ground.

Distribution
Coast, lower and middle mountains, Beqaa valley in Lebanon.

Geographic area
Syria, Lebanon, the Palestine region, the Eastern Mediterranean, and southern Europe.

The generic name is derived from the Greek erôdios, heron, since the fruit of this plant, which ends in a long bill, suggests the bill of a heron. The specific
name, indicating that the plant is stemless, is formed of the privative prefix a and of the Greek kaulos, stem

References

Georges Tohme& Henriette Tohme, IIIustrated Flora of Lebanon, National Council For Scientific Research, Second Edition 2014.

acaule
Flora of Lebanon and Syria
Flora of Palestine (region)
Taxa named by Carl Linnaeus
Flora of Malta